Stevie Nicks supported the release of her third album Rock a Little with a world tour, which included shows in the United States, Canada and Australia. The tour started on April 11, 1986 in Houston, Texas and ended on October 6, 1986, in Sydney, Australia.

For the tour, Stevie performed four songs from Rock a Little: "Talk to Me", "No Spoken Word", "I Can’t Wait" and "Has Anyone Ever Written Anything for You?".

The August 20 Red Rocks Amphitheatre show in Morrison, Colorado was taped and subsequently released on video in 1987. The September 16 Cayuga County Fairgrounds show in Weedsport, New York was recorded and later rebroadcast for the Westwood One Radio Networks Superstar Concert Series.

The Austrian band Opus and Peter Frampton were the support acts.

Set list  
 Gold Dust Woman*
 Outside the Rain
 Dreams
 Talk to Me
 I Need to Know (Tom Petty and the Heartbreakers cover)
 No Spoken Word
 Sara*
 Beauty and the Beast
 I Can't Wait
 Leather and Lace
 Stand Back
 Stop Draggin' My Heart Around
 Edge of Seventeen
Encore
 Rhiannon
 Has Anyone Ever Written Anything for You?

*Performed at some shows early on the tour.

Tour dates

Personnel 
Sources
 Stevie Nicks – lead vocals
 Jennifer Condos – bass
 Bobbye Hall – percussion
 Rick Marotta – drums 
 Bobby Martin – keyboards, horns, vocals
 Jai Winding – keyboards
 Waddy Wachtel – guitar
 Sharon Celani – backing vocals
 Lori Perry – backing vocals
 Elisecia Wright – backing vocals

References 

1986 concert tours
Stevie Nicks concert tours